Bukenya is an Ugandan surname. Notable people with the surname include:

Austin Bukenya (born 1944), Ugandan poet, playwright, novelist, and academic
Gilbert Bukenya (born 1949), Ugandan politician and physician 
Ivan Bukenya (born 1981), Ugandan football player

Surnames of African origin